This is a list of tribute albums, organized according to the original artists.

A 
 ABBA
 Abba-esque (Erasure, 1992)
 ABBAmania (1999)
 The ABBA Generation (1999)
 A Tribute to ABBA (2001)
 Dancing Queen (2018)
Masters of the Scene: The Definitive ABBA Tribute (2003)
 Accept
 A Tribute to Accept
 A Tribute to Accept II
 Accept Metal or Die: A Tribute to Accept
 AC/DC
 Fusebox – The Alternative Tribute (1995)
 Thunderbolt: A Tribute to AC/DC (1998)
A Hillbilly Tribute to AC/DC (performed by Hayseed Dixie), (2001)
 Graveyard Classics 2 (performed by Six Feet Under) (2004)
 Aerosmith
 Not The Same Old Song And Dance: A Tribute To Aerosmith (1999)
 Let the Tribute Do the Talkin' - Tribute to Aerosmith (2014)
 Right in the Nuts: A Tribute to Aerosmith (2000)
 One Way Street: A Tribute to Aerosmith (2002)
 Alice Cooper
 Welcome to Our Nightmare: A Tribute To Alice Cooper (1993)
 Humanary Stew: A Tribute to Alice Cooper (1999)
 Steve Allen
 The Time of My Life: Roseanna Vitro Sings the Songs of Steve Allen
 The Allman Brothers Band
 Midnight Rider – Tribute to The Allman Brothers Band
 Alter Bridge
String Tribute to Alter Bridge (2011)
 Anthrax
 Indians... Not! Brazilian tribute to Anthrax (2007)
 Caught in Time: A Tribute to Anthrax (2012)
 String Tribute to Anthrax

B 
Bad Brains
Never Give In: A Tribute to Bad Brains (1999)
Bad Religion
Germs Of Perfection: A Tribute To Bad Religion (2010)
The Band
Endless Highway: The Music of The Band (2007)
Garth Hudson Presents A Canadian Celebration Of The Band (2010)
Syd Barrett
Beyond the Wildwood (1987)
Mojo Presents: The Madcap Laughs Again! (2010)
 The Beatles
The Chipmunks sing the Beatles Hits (1964)
McLemore Avenue (Booker T. & the M.G.'s, 1970)
The Other Side of Abbey Road (George Benson, 1970)
All This and World War II (original soundtrack, 1976)
Sgt. Pepper's Lonely Hearts Club Band (original soundtrack, 1978)
Let It Be (Laibach, 1988)
Come Together: America Salutes The Beatles (1995)
In My Life (George Martin, 1998)
I Am Sam (original soundtrack, 2001)
The Persuasions Sing The Beatles (The Persuasions, 2002)
When They Was Fab – a Tribute to the Solo Beatles (Hallmark, 2002)
This Bird Has Flown – A 40th Anniversary Tribute to the Beatles' Rubber Soul (2005)
Mojo Presents: Revolver Reloaded (2006)
Across the Universe (original soundtrack, 2007)
Meet The Smithereens! (2007)
Mojo Presents: Sgt. Pepper... With a Little Help From His Friends (2007)
Blackbird: The Music of Lennon and McCartney (Katie Noonan, 2008)
Mojo Presents: The White Album Recovered (2008)
Imagine That (original soundtrack, 2009)
Mojo Presents: Abbey Road Now! (2009)
"Help!" The Story of Eleanor Rigby and Billy Shears (Overboard, 2009)
Sgt. Pepper Live (Cheap Trick, 2009)
Mojo Presents: Let It Be Revisited (2010)
Mojo Presents: Yellow Submarine Resurfaces (2012)
Top Musicians Play The Beatles (2012)
Sgt. Pepper's Lonely Hearts Club Band (Art of Time Ensemble, 2013)
Mojo Presents: We're With the Beatles (2013)
With a Little Help from My Fwends (The Flaming Lips, 2014)
Keep Calm and Salute The Beatles (2015)
Looking Through You: A 50th Anniversary Tribute to the Beatles' Rubber Soul (2015)
Tomorrow Never Knows: A 50th Anniversary Tribute to the Beatles' Revolver (2015)
 Big Star
 Big Star, Small World (2006)
 Björk
 Enjoyed: A Tribute to Björk's Post (2008)
 Black Sabbath
 Nativity in Black (1994)
 Tribute to Black Sabbath: Eternal Masters (1994)
 Masters of Misery – Black Sabbath: The Earache Tribute (1997)
 Nativity in Black II (2000)
 Nativity in Black III (2003)
 Hands of Doom – A Tribute to Black Sabbath (2013)
 Art Blakey
 Tony Allen A Tribute To Art Blakey & The Jazz Messengers (2017)
 Bleachers
 Terrible Thrills, Vol. 2 (2015)
 Blind Guardian
 Tales From the Underworld (2003)
 James Blundell
 30 Years of Pride: A Tribute to James Blundell
 David Bowie
 Only Bowie (1995)
 Crash Course for the Raves: A Tribute to David Bowie (1996)
 David Bowie Songbook (1997)
 Ashes to Ashes: A Tribute to David Bowie (1999)
 Goth Oddity: A Tribute to David Bowie (1999)
 The Dark Side of David Bowie (2000)
 The String Quartet Tribute to David Bowie (2002)
 Sound + Vision: The Electronic Tribute to David Bowie (2002)
 Starman (Uncut Magazine) (2003)
 A Classic Rock Tribute to Bowie by The Classic Rock String Quartet (2004)
 2. Contamination: A Tribute to David Bowie (2006)
 Oh You Pretty Things: Songs of David Bowie (2006)
 Spiders from Venus
 Bowiemania: Tribute to David Bowie (2007)
 David Bowie Acoustic Tribute (2007)
 Tribute to David Bowie (2007)
 We Were So Turned On: A Tribute to David Bowie (2010)
 Twinkle Twinkle Little Rock Star: Lullabye Version of David Bowie (2010)
 House of David (Lea DeLaria) (2015)
 Let All the Children Boogie: A Tribute to David Bowie (2015)
 A Salute to the Thin White Duke – The Songs of David Bowie (2015)
  Many Faces of David Bowie (2016)
  Loving the Alien (A Low Budget Tribute to David Bowie) (2017)
 Bowiesongs1 (2017)
 Garth Brooks
 The Complete Tribute to Garth Brooks (2003)
 Jackson Browne
 Looking Into You: A Tribute to Jackson Browne (2014)

C 
 Andrés Calamaro
 Calamaro querido! Cantando al salmón (2006)
 J.J. Cale
 Eric Clapton The Breeze: An Appreciation of JJ Cale (2014)
 Cardiacs
 Leader of the Starry Skies: A Tribute to Tim Smith, Songbook 1 (2010)
 Singin' to God (2018)
 Brandi Carlile
 Cover Stories (2017)
 The Carpenters
 If I Were a Carpenter (1994)
 The Cars
 Substitution Mass Confusion: A Tribute to The Cars (2005)
 Cartoon Theme Songs
 Saturday Morning: Cartoons' Greatest Hits (various artists, 1995)
 Peter Case
 A Case For Case: A Tribute To The Songs Of Peter Case (various artists, 2006)
 Johnny Cash
 Kindred Spirits: A Tribute to the Songs of Johnny Cash (2002)
 We Walk the Line: A Celebration of the Music of Johnny Cash (2012)
 Harry Chapin
 Harry Chapin Tribute (1990)
 Ray Charles
 Shirley Horn Light Out of Darkness (A Tribute to Ray Charles) (1993)
 Catchin' Some Rays: The Music of Ray Charles (1997)
 Here We Go Again: Celebrating the Genius of Ray Charles (2011)
 Cheap Trick
 Cheap Dream: A Tribute to Cheap Trick
 Vic Chesnutt
 Sweet Relief II: Gravity of the Situation (1996)
 The Clash
 The Clash Tribute: The Never Ending Story (Part 1) (various artists, 1991)
 Burning London: The Clash Tribute (various artists, 1999)
 City Rockers: A Tribute To The Clash (various artists, 2002)
 This Is Rockabilly Clash (various artists, 2002)
 White Riot: A Tribute to The Clash Vols 1 & 2 (various artists, 2003)
 Charlie Does Surf (A Tribute to The Clash) (various artists, 2004)
 The Sandinista! Project: A Tribute to The Clash) (various artists, 2007)
 Bruce Cockburn
 Kick at the Darkness
 Leonard Cohen
 Famous Blue Raincoat (Jennifer Warnes, 1987)
 I'm Your Fan (1991)
 Tower of Song (1995)
 Leonard Cohen: I'm Your Man (film soundtrack, 2006)
 Cold Chisel
 Standing On The Outside: The Songs Of Cold Chisel (2007)
 Cy Coleman
 The Best Is Yet to Come: The Songs of Cy Coleman (2009)
 Judy Collins
 Born to the Breed: A Tribute to Judy Collins (2008)
 Phil Collins
 Urban Renewal: Featuring the Songs of Phil Collins (2001)
 Noël Coward
 Twentieth-Century Blues: The Songs of Noel Coward (1998)
 The Cure
 Our Voices – A Tribute to the Cure (2004)
 Perfect as Cats (2008)

D 
 The Damned
 Children of the Damned (1996)

 Daniel Amos & Terry Scott Taylor
 When Worlds Collide (1999)

 Miles Davis
 Freddie Hubbard Blues for Miles (1992)
 Keith Jarrett Bye Bye Blackbird (1993)
 Joe Henderson So Near, So Far (Musings for Miles) (1993)
 Benny Golson I Remember Miles (1993)
 A Tribute to Miles (1994)
 Shirley Horn I Remember Miles (1998)
 Freddie Hubbard At Jazz Jamboree Warszawa '91: A Tribute to Miles (2000)
 Jimmy Cobb, George Coleman, Mike Stern, Ron Carter Four Generations of Miles: A Live Tribute to Miles (2002)
 Marcus Miller Tutu Revisited – Live 2010 (2011)

dc Talk
Freaked!
 Deep Purple
 Cactus Jack Deep Purple Tribute (2003)
 Funky Junction Play a Tribute to Deep Purple (1973)
 Def Leppard
 Leppardmania: A Tribute to Def Leppard (2000)
 Tributized: Tribute to Def Leppard (2000)
 Matt Nathanson Pyromattia (2018)
 Sandy Denny
 Vikki Clayton: It Suits Me Well - The Songs Of Sandy Denny (1994)
 No Grey Faith (Iain Matthews' project): Secrets all Told - The Songs of Sandy Denny (2000)
 Continental Drifters: Listen, Listen (2001)
 John Denver
 The Music Is You: A Tribute to John Denver
 Great Voices Sing John Denver
 Rocky Mountain Memories – An Instrumental Tribute to John Denver
 Depeche Mode 
 I Sometimes Wish I Was Famous: A Swedish Tribute to Depeche Mode
 For the Masses
 Color Theory presents Depeche Mode
 Destruction Time Again (Tribute to Depeche Mode + Recoil) by Louis Guidone
 Ronnie James Dio
 Dio (2010)
 Holy Dio: Tribute to Ronnie James Dio (2000)
 Ronnie James Dio – This Is Your Life (2014)
Disney
Stay Awake: Various Interpretations of Music from Vintage Disney Films (1988)
 The Doors
 Stoned Immaculate: The Music of the Doors (2000)
 Dream Theater
 Voices: A Tribute to Dream Theater (1999)
 Duran Duran
 The Best of Duran Duran (1993)
 The Duran Duran Tribute Album (1997)
 Glue: a tribute to the Music of Duran Duran (1999)
 The Songs of Duran Duran UnDone (1999)
 Studio 99: Duran Duran Tribute (2000)
 A Tribute to Duran Duran (2003)
 Electrotrash Undone: A Tribute To Duran Duran (2004)
 The String Quartet Tribute to Duran Duran (2004)
 Piano Tribute to Duran Duran (2011)
 Making Patterns Rhyme: A Tribute to Duran Duran (2014)
 Bob Dylan
 Tangled Up In Blues: Songs of Bob Dylan (1996)
 A Nod to Bob: Tribute to Bob Dylan on His Sixtieth Birthday (2001)
 Is it Rolling Bob? A Reggae Tribute to Bob Dylan (2004)
 Les Fradkin "If Your Memory Serves You Well" (2006)
 I'm Not There (film soundtrack, 2007)
 Chimes of Freedom: The Songs of Bob Dylan Honoring 50 Years of Amnesty International (2012)

E 
 Eagles
Common Thread: The Songs of the Eagles (1993)
 Edward Kennedy "Duke" Ellington
 Toshiko Akiyoshi Jazz Orchestra Tribute to Duke Ellington (1999)
 Roky Erickson
 Where the Pyramid Meets the Eye: A Tribute to Roky Erickson (1990, 2017)
 Bill Evans
 VA Bill Evans – A tribute (1983)
 Roseanna Vitro Conviction: Thoughts of Bill Evans (2001)
 Gil Evans
 The Gil Evans Orchestra Tribute To Gil (1989)
 Eyehategod
 For the Sick (2006)

F 
 Fats Domino
 Goin' Home: A Tribute to Fats Domino (2007)
 Finn Brothers
 She Will Have Her Way (2005)
 He Will Have His Way (2010)
 Clare Fischer
 Clarity: Music of Clare Fischer
 Fleetwood Mac
 Legacy: A Tribute to Fleetwood Mac's Rumours (1998)
 Just Tell Me That You Want Me: A Tribute to Fleetwood Mac (2012)
 Foreigner
 Tribute to Foreigner (2002)

G 
 Peter Gabriel
 Leaves from the Tree: A Tribute to Peter Gabriel (2001)
 And I'll Scratch Yours (2013)
 Serge Gainsbourg
 Monsieur Gainsbourg Revisited
 Galaxie 500
 Snowstorm
 Genesis
 Genesis for two Grand Pianos Vol. I (2000), Vol. II (2004)
 After Genesis: The Cryme of Selling Lambs (2004)
 Rewiring Genesis: A Tribute to The Lamb Lies Down On Broadway (2008)
 GG Allin
 Hated in the Cosmos: A Stellar Tribute to GG Allin (2019)
 Jean-Jacques Goldman
 Génération Goldman (2012)
 Steve Goodman
 My Old Man (2006)
 The Grateful Dead
Deadicated: A Tribute to the Grateful Dead (1991)
 Pickin' on the Grateful Dead: A Tribute (1997)
 Might As Well...The Persuasions Sing Grateful Dead (2000; Arista/Grateful Dead)
 Day of the Dead (2016)

H 
 Sammy Hagar
 Three Lock Box: A Millenium Tribute to Sammy Hagar (2006)
 Merle Haggard
 Mama's Hungry Eyes: A Tribute to Merle Haggard (1994)
 George Harrison
 George Fest (2016)
 Mark Heard
 Orphans of God (1996)
 Strong Hand of Love (1994)
Joe Henderson
 Renee Rosnes Black Narcissus: A Tribute to Joe Henderson (2008)
 Jimi Hendrix
 Stone Free: A Tribute to Jimi Hendrix (1993)
 Power of Soul: A Tribute to Jimi Hendrix (2004)
 Kristin Hersh
 Hot Hands: A Tribute to Throwing Muses & Kristin Hersh (2003)
 hide
 Tribute Spirits (1999)
 Buddy Holly
Listen to Me: Buddy Holly (2011)
Rave On Buddy Holly (2011)
The Buddy Holly Country Tribute: Remember Me (2014)

I 
 Iron Maiden
 See: Music in tribute of Iron Maiden

J 
 Alan Jackson
  Under the Influence (1999)
 Michael Jackson
 Never Can Say Goodbye: The Music of Michael Jackson
 Rava on the Dance Floor
 Thriller: A Metal Tribute to Michael Jackson
 Unity: The Latin Tribute to Michael Jackson
 Trijntje Oosterhuis: Never Can Say Goodbye
 Wanda Jackson
 Hard Headed Woman: A Celebration of Wanda Jackson (2004)
 The Jam
 Fire and Skill: The Songs of the Jam (1999)
 Jandek
 Naked in the Afternoon: A Tribute to Jandek (2000)
 Down in a Mirror: A Second Tribute to Jandek (2005)
 Jawbreaker
Bad Scene, Everyone's Fault (2003)
 Elton John
Two Rooms: Celebrating the Songs of Elton John and Bernie Taupin (1991)
Revamp: Reimagining the Songs of Elton John & Bernie Taupin (2018)
Restoration: Reimagining the Songs of Elton John and Bernie Taupin (2018)
 Robert Johnson
Me and Mr. Johnson (performed by Eric Clapton, 2004)
Todd Rundgren's Johnson (performed by Todd Rundgren, 2011)
 Journey
 An '80s Metal Tribute to Journey (2006)
 Joy Division
 A Means to an End: The Music of Joy Division
 Judas Priest
 A Tribute to Judas Priest: Legends of Metal (1997)
 A Tribute to Judas Priest, Vol. 2: Delivering the Goods (2000)
 A Tribute to the Priest (2002, Nuclear Blast)
 Hell Bent Forever: A Tribute to Judas Priest (2008)

K 
Kerbdog
 Pledge: A Tribute to Kerbdog (2010)
Carole King
 Tapestry Revisited: A Tribute to Carole King (1995)
The Kinks (The Kinks tribute albums)
 Shangri-La – A Tribute to The Kinks (1989)
 Give the People What We Want: Songs of The Kinks (2001)
 This Is Where I Belong: The Songs of Ray Davies and The Kinks (2002)
 The Modern Genius of Ray Davies (MOJO magazine CD) (2006)
 Kontroversial Kovers (2013)
Kirsty MacColl
 A Concert for Kirtsy MacColl (2013)
 Kiss
 Hard to Believe: Kiss Covers Compilation (1990)
 Kiss My Ass: Classic Kiss Regrooved (1994)
 Kiss My Grass: A Hillbilly Tribute to Kiss (performed by Hayseed Dixie) (2003)
 Spin the Bottle – An All-Star Tribute to Kiss (2004)
 KISS MY ANKH: A Tribute To Vinnie Vincent (2008)

L 
 Avril Lavigne
 A Tribute to Avril Lavigne (2003)
 Boys on Top: A Punk Rock Tribute to Avril Lavigne (2004)
 Led Zeppelin
 Encomium (1995)
 Pickin' on Led Zeppelin, Vol. 1-2 (2003)
 John Lennon
 Working Class Hero: A Tribute to John Lennon (1995)
 Gordon Lightfoot
 Beautiful: A Tribute to Gordon Lightfoot (2003)
 Love
 We're All Normal and We Want Our Freedom – A Tribute to Arthur Lee and Love (1994)
Jeff Lynne
 Lynne Me Your Ears (2001)
Lynyrd Skynyrd
 Skynyrd Frynds (1994)

M 
 Marilyn Manson
 Anthems of Rust and Decay: A Tribute to Marilyn Manson (2000)
 Anonymous Messiah: A Tribute to Marilyn Manson (2001)
 Tribute to Marilyn Manson (2002)
 Salvation + Devotion: A Tribute to Marilyn Manson (2007)
 The String Quartet Tribute to Marilyn Manson (2007) (performed by The Vitamin String Quartet)
 Curtis Mayfield
 People Get Ready – A Tribute to Curtis Mayfield (1993)
 A Tribute to Curtis Mayfield (1994)
 I'm So Proud: A Jamaican Tribute to Curtis Mayfield (1997)
 Paul McCartney
 The Art of McCartney (2014)
 Megadeth
 Megaded: A Tribute to Megadeth (1999)
 A Tribute to Megadeth – Gigadeath (2006)
 This Is the News - The Tribute to Megadeth (2007)
 Hangar of Souls: Tribute to Megadeth (2013)
 Metallica
 A Garage Dayz Nite (performed by Beatallica)
 Beatallica (performed by Beatallica)
 A Tribute to Metallica (performed by Die Krupps) (1992)
 Plays Metallica by Four Cellos (performed by Apocalyptica) (1996)
 The Blackest Album: An Industrial Tribute to Metallica (1998)
 Metallic Assault: A Tribute to Metallica (2001)
 Overload: A Tribute To Metallica (1998)
 A Punk Tribute to Metallica (2001)
 A Tribute to the Four Horsemen (2002, re-issued in 2003 with a different track listing)
 Metallic Attack: The Ultimate Tribute (2005)
 Sgt. Hetfield's Motorbreath Pub Band (performed by Beatallica) (2007)
 Pianotarium: Piano Tribute to Metallica (performed by Scott D. Davis) (2007)
 Say Your Prayers, Little One: The String Quartet Tribute to Metallica (performed by The Vitamin String Quartet)
 Midnight Oil
 The Power & The Passion (2001)
 Minor Threat
 Un Tributo a Minor Threat (1997)
 The Mission
 A Tribute to the Mission – Forevermore  (1999)
 Joni Mitchell
 Back to the Garden (1992)
 River: The Joni Letters (2007)
 A Tribute to Joni Mitchell (2007)
 Thelonious Monk
 A tribute to Monk and Bird (1978)
 The Moody Blues
 Justin Hayward and Friends Sing the Moody Blues Classic Hits (1996)
 Moody Bluegrass: A Nashville Tribute to The Moody Blues (2004)
 Moody Bluegrass TWO... Much Love (2011)
 Van Morrison
 No Prima Donna: The Songs of Van Morrison (1994)
 Vanthology: A Tribute to Van Morrison (2003)
 The Van Morrison Songbook (1997)
 Mötley Crüe
 Nashville Outlaws: A Tribute to Mötley Crüe (2014)
 Gerry Mulligan
 The Gerry Mulligan Songbook (1997)
 The Muppets
 Muppets: The Green Album  (2011)

N 
 Nationalteatern
 Nationalsånger – Hymner från Vågen och EPAs torg
 Randy Newman
 Nilsson Sings Newman (1970)
 The Music of Randy Newman
 Harry Nilsson
 For The Love of Harry: Everybody Sings Nilsson (1995)
 I'll Never Leave You: A Tribute to Harry Nilsson (2005)
 This is the Town: A Tribute to Nilsson, Vol. 1 (2014)
 Nine Inch Nails
 Covered in Nails: A Tribute to Nine Inch Nails (2000)
 Re-Covered in Nails: A Tribute to Nine Inch Nails (2001)
 Closer to the Spiral: A Tribute to Nine Inch Nails (2001)
 The Broken Machine: A Tribute to Nine Inch Nails (2001)
 Absence of Faith: The Tribute to Nine Inch Nails (2002)
 The String Quartet Tribute to Nine Inch Nails (2002) (performed by The Vitamin String Quartet)
 A Tribute to Nine Inch Nails (2004)
 The Piano Tribute to Nine Inch Nails (2005)
 Gothic Acoustic Tribute to Nine Inch Nails (2005)
 Radiant Decay: A Tribute to Nine Inch Nails (2007)
 The String Quartet Tribute to Nine Inch Nails' Pretty Hate Machine (2007)
 Pretty Eight Machine (2012)
 Nirvana
 Smells Like Bleach: A Punk Tribute to Nirvana
 NRBQ
 The Q People – A Tribute To NRBQ (2004)
 Ted Nugent
 Bulletproof Tribute: Ted Nugent Tribute (2001)
 Tribute to Ted Nugent: Cat Scratch Fever (2005)

O 
 Oingo Boingo
 Dead Bands Party: A Tribute to Oingo Boingo (2005)
 Orchestral Manoeuvres in the Dark
 Messages: Modern Synthpop Artists Cover OMD (2001)
 Pretending to See the Future: A Tribute to OMD (2001)
 Ozzy Osbourne
 Bat Head Soup: A Tribute to Ozzy (2000)

P 
 Charlie Parker
 A tribute to Monk and Bird (1978)
 Pantera
 Southern Death: Tribute to Pantera (2000)
 The Art of Shredding: A Tribute to Dime (2006)
 Gram Parsons
 Conmemorativo: A Tribute To Gram Parsons (1993)
 Return of the Grievous Angel: A Tribute to Gram Parsons (1999)
 Dolly Parton
 Just Because I'm a Woman: Songs of Dolly Parton (2003)
 Pet Shop Boys
 Very Introspective, Actually - A Tribute to The Pet Shop Boys (2001)
 Goes Petshopping (2006)
 Tom Petty
 You Got Lucky: A Tribute to Tom Petty (1994)
 Phish
 Sharin' in the Groove: Celebrating the Music of Phish (2000)
 The Pillows
 Synchronized Rockers (2005)
 Pink Floyd
 Back Against The Wall (by Billy Sherwood and a host of various artists, 2005)
 Dub Side of the Moon (2003)
 Dubber Side of the Moon (2008)
 The Flaming Lips and Stardeath and White Dwarfs with Henry Rollins and Peaches Doing The Dark Side of the Moon (2009)
 Rebuild the Wall (by Luther Wright and the Wrongs, 2001)
 Return to the Dark Side of the Moon (Three albums with this name, the latest released in Mojo (magazine) in 2011)
 The Many Faces Of Pink Floyd (A Journey Through The Inner World Of Pink Floyd) (2013)
 Pixies
 Where Is My Mind? Tribute to the Pixies (1999)
 Pixies Fuckin' Die! (1999)
 La La Love You Pixies!! (2004)
 The Police
 Policia!: A Tribute to the Police
Iggy Pop
 We Will Fall: The Iggy Pop Tribute (1997)
 Cozy Powell
 Cozy Powell Forever
 Los Prisioneros
 Tributo a Los Prisioneros (2000)
 Prince
 Purplish Rain (2009)

Q 
 Queen
 Dragon Attack: A Tribute to Queen (1997)
 Killer Queen: A Tribute to Queen (2005)
 Queens of the Stone Age
 A Tribute to Queens of the Stone Age (2004)
 The String Quartet Tribute to Queens of the Stone Age: Strings for the Deaf (2004)
 Queensrÿche
 Rebellion: Tribute to Queensrÿche (2000)
 Warning, Minds of Raging Empires, Vol. 1: A Tribute to Queensryche (2001)

R 
 Radiohead
 Exit Music: Songs with Radio Heads (2006)
 Radiodread (2006)
 OKX (2007)
Raffi
Country Goes Raffi (2001)
 Ramones
 Ramones (1992)
 Rocket To Russia (1994)
 Rocket to Ramonia (1996)
 File Under Ramones (1999)
 We're A Happy Family – A Tribute To The Ramones (2003)
 Lou Reed
What Goes On (The Songs Of Lou Reed)(2021)
R.E.M.
 Drive XV: A Tribute to Automatic for the People (2007)
 Surprise Your Pig: A Tribute to R.E.M. (1992)
 Rheostatics
 The Secret Sessions (2007)
 Roxy Music
 Dream Home Heartaches...Remaking/Remodeling Roxy Music (1997)
 Rush
Working Man – A Tribute to Rush (1996)
Red Star: Tribute to Rush (1999)
Subdivisions: A Tribute to Rush (2005)
New World Man: A Tribute to Rush (2010)

S 
Saxon
 A Metal Crusade: Tribute to Saxon (2001)
Savatage
 Return of the Mountain King (2000)
Adam Schlesinger
Saving for a Custom Van (2020)
Scorpions
 Covered Like a Hurricane: A tribute to Scorpions (2000)
 A Tribute To The Scorpions (2001)
 Another Piece Of Metal: Tribute To Scorpions (2001)
 Selena
Selena ¡VIVE! (2005)
 Sepultura
World of Pain (1999)
Sepulchral Feast (2001)
The Shaggs
Better than the Beatles (2001)
Sick of It All
 Our Impact Will Be Felt
Frank Sinatra
 Manilow Sings Sinatra (1998)
 Bolton Swings Sinatra (2006)
 Slayer
Gateway to Hell (1999)
Gateway to Hell 2 (2000)
Hell at Last (2003)
Slatanic Slaughter (1995)
Slatanic Slaughter II (1996)
Straight to Hell (1999)
 Slowdive
 Blue Skied an' Clear (2002)
 Tony Sly
 The Songs of Tony Sly: A Tribute (2013)
 The Smashing Pumpkins
 Ghost Children: A Tribute To The Smashing Pumpkins (2001)
 A Gothic-Industrial Tribute to The Smashing Pumpkins (2001)
 Midnight in the Patch: Tribute to the Smashing Pumpkins (2001)
 The Killer in You: A Tribute to Smashing Pumpkins (2005)
 Ghost Children/Friends and Enemies (2006)
 Elliott Smith
 The String Quartet Tribute to Elliott Smith (2004)
 A Tribute to Elliott Smith (2005)
 Remote Memory: A Tribute to Elliot Smith (2006)
 To Elliott, From Portland (2006)
 Home to Oblivion: An Elliott Smith Tribute (2006)
 Coming Up Roses: Sacramento Remembers Elliott Smith (2007)
 Say Yes! A Tribute to Elliott Smith (2016)
 The Smiths
 The Smiths Is Dead (1996)
 Snot
 Strait Up – a Tribute to Lynn Strait (2000)
 Stephen Sondheim
 Liaisons: Re-Imagining Sondheim from the Piano (2015)
Dusty Springfield
 Shelby Lynne: Just a Little Lovin' (2008)
Joe Strummer
 Shatter the Hotel: A Dub Inspired Tribute to Joe Strummer (various artists, 2009)
Styx
 A Tribute to Styx (2002)
 Suicidal Tendencies
 Suicide In Venice (2000)
Taylor Swift
 1989 (Ryan Adams, 2015)

T 
 Steve Taylor
 I Predict A Clone
 Teresa Teng
 Decadent Sound of Faye (1995)
 A Tribute to Teresa Teng (1995)
 Terry Scott Taylor & Daniel Amos
 When Worlds Collide (1999)
 Testament
 Jump In The Pit (2000)
 They Might Be Giants
Hello Radio: Songs of They Might Be Giants (2006)
 Throwing Muses
 Hot Hands: A Tribute to Throwing Muses & Kristin Hersh (2003)
 Richard Thompson
 Continental Drifters: Listen, Listen (2001)
 Tullycraft
 First String Teenage High: The Songs of Tullycraft Played By People Who Aren't (2003)
 Wish I'd Kept A Scrapbook: A Tribute to Tullycraft (2010)
 Turbonegro
 Alpha Motherfuckers: A Tribute to Turbonegro (2001)
 Twisted Sister
 Destroyer: Tribute To Twisted Sister (2001)
 Twisted Forever (2001)

U 
 U2
 We Will Follow: A Tribute to U2 (1998)
 Pride: The Royal Philharmonic Orchestra Plays U2 (1999)
 With or Without You (2000)
 AHK-toong BAY-bi Covered (2011)
 U2 Electronic tribute: blue sky vertigo (Electron Love Theory) (2010)
UFO
 Lights Out: The Ultimate Tribute to UFO (2006)
 Hikaru Utada
 Utada Hikaru no Uta (2014)

V 
 Van Halen
 Everybody Wants Some: A Loose Interpretation of the Musical Genius of Van Halen (1997)
 Little Guitars: A Tribute to Van Halen (2000)
 Runnin' With the Devil: A Tribute to Van Halen (2000)
 Best of Both Worlds: A Tribute to Van Halen (2003)
 80's Metal Tribute to Van Halen (2006)
 Strummin' with the Devil: The Southern Side of Van Halen (2006)
 Stevie Ray Vaughan
 A Tribute to Stevie Ray Vaughan (1996)
 The Velvet Underground
 Fifteen Minutes – A Tribute to the Velvet Underground (1994)
 Venom
 A Tribute to Venom – In the Name of Satan (1994)
 Promoters of the Third World War – A Tribute to Venom (1997)
 In The Sign Of The Horns (2000)
 Mayhem without Mercy – A Hardcore Punkrock Tribute to Venom (2003)
 Gods of Goats – A Tribute to Venom (2007)
 A Tribute to Venom (Sigh, 2008)

W 
 W.A.S.P.
 Show No Mercy: Tribute To WASP (2001)
 Tom Waits
 Step Right Up: The Songs of Tom Waits (1995)
 Anywhere I Lay My Head (2008)
 Grapefruit Moon: The Songs of Tom Waits (Southside Johnny) (2008)
 Weezer
 Rock Music: A Tribute to Weezer (2002)
 Kurt Weill
 Lost In The Stars (1985)
 the Wiggles
 ReWiggled - A Tribute to the Wiggles (2011)
 ReWiggled (2022)
 White Zombie
 Super-Charger Hell (2000)
 Whitesnake
 Still Of The Night: A Millennium Tribute to Whitesnake (2013)
 Keith Whitley
 Keith Whitley: A Tribute Album (1994)
 The Who
 Who Covers Who? (1994)
 Substitute: The Songs of The Who (2001)
 Victoria Williams
 Sweet Relief: A Benefit for Victoria Williams (1993)
 John Williamson
 Absolute Greatest: 40 Years True Blue (2010)
 Bob Wills
 A Tribute to the Best Damn Fiddle Player in the World (or, My Salute to Bob Wills) (1970)
 Salute the Majesty of Bob Wills (performed by the Pine Valley Cosmonauts with guest vocalists) (1998)
 Brian Wilson
 Making God Smile: An Artists' Tribute to the Songs of Beach Boy Brian Wilson (2002)

X 
 XTC
 A Testimonial Dinner: The Songs of XTC (1995)

Y 
 Yes
 Tales from Yesterday (1995)
 Neil Young
 The Bridge: A Tribute to Neil Young (1991)
 Borrowed Tunes: A Tribute to Neil Young (1994)
 Borrowed Tunes II: A Tribute to Neil Young (2007)

Z 
 Frank Zappa
 Frankly A Cappella: The Persuasions sing Zappa (2000)
 Warren Zevon
 Enjoy Every Sandwich: The Songs of Warren Zevon
 Rob Zombie
 The Electro-Industrial Tribute to Rob Zombie (2002)
 ZZ Top
 ZZ Top: A Tribute from Friends (2011)
 Sharp Dressed Men: A Tribute to ZZ Top (2002)

See also 
Lists of albums
Pickin' On…, a series of tribute albums performed in the bluegrass style

References 

 
Musical tributes